UNESCO's list of intangible cultural heritage from Azerbaijan includes 15 examples. 13 of them were included in the "Representative List of the Intangible Cultural Heritage of Humatiy", and 2 (the Chovgan horse-riding game played with the Karabakh horse and the traditional group dances of Nakhchivan – yalli, kochari, tanzera) were included in the "Intangible Cultural Heritage in Need of Urgent Protection". No examples from Azerbaijan were included in the "Register of Good Safeguarding Practices". The Azerbaijani mugham, the first sample from Azerbaijan to be added to the list of intangible cultural heritage of UNESCO, was included in the list in 2008.

The concept of intangible cultural heritage is regulated by the Convention on the Safeguarding of Intangible Cultural Heritage, which was adopted at the 32nd session of UNESCO in Paris in 2003 and entered into force in 2006. The inclusion of new heritage elements in UNESCO's lists of intangible cultural heritage is determined by the Intergovernmental Committee for the Safeguarding of Intangible Cultural Heritage established by the convention. According to UNESCO, intangible cultural heritage includes holidays, festivals, performances, oral traditions, music and handicrafts.

UNESCO intangible cultural heritage samples selected from Azerbaijan are taken in the "Europe and North America" category. 10 of Azerbaijan's heritage examples are unique to Azerbaijan, and 5 are multinational. Countries with shared multi-ethnic heritage patterns are from West, Central and South Asia. Iran, Turkey and Kazakhstan are the countries with the most examples of shared heritage with Azerbaijan.

Some cultural artifacts are exclusive to certain Azerbaijani localities (Nakhchivan , Basqal, Lahic, Goychay, Shaki). Particularly, the Ismailli district is the one with the greatest amount of cultural treasures (Basqal pottery and Lahic copper art).

The first object, Azerbaijani mugham, was included into the list in 2008.

List

Representative List of the Intangible Cultural Heritage of Humanity

List of Intangible Cultural Heritage in Need of Urgent Safeguarding

Register of Good Safeguarding Practices 

No example from Azerbaijan is included in this UNESCO list.

Nominations

Ongoing Nominations

Reserved Nominations

Intangible cultural heritage cooperation

Notes

References 

{{|en|The art music of Azerbaijan is connected with the Irano-Arabo-Turkish art of the maqām, of which the great theoreticians were notably Ṣafī-al-dīn Ormavī (d. 693/1294) and ʿAbd-al-Qāder b. Ḡaybī Marāḡī (d. 838/1435), who were originally from Urmia and Marāḡa in Azerbaijan.}}
UNESCO
Azerbaijani culture
Lists of Intangible Cultural Heritage of Humanity